The Man of Peace is an award conceptualized in 1999 by the annual World Summit of Nobel Peace Laureates in Rome. The purpose of the award is to recognize individuals who "from personalities from the world of culture and entertainment who have stood up for human rights and for the spread of the principles of Peace and Solidarity in the world, made an outstanding contribution to international social justice and peace".

The award was an initiative by former Soviet leader Mikhail Gorbachev, himself a winner of a Nobel Peace Prize. It is presented in Rome's Campidoglio (Capitoline Hill) by President Gorbachev, Walter Veltroni, Mayor of Rome, and the Nobel Peace Prize Laureates attending the annual summit meeting. 

In its early years the award was referred to as both the "Man for Peace" in Europe and "Man of Peace" in the United States. In 2006 its title was officially changed to "Man of Peace", also "Peace Summit Award".

Recipients

2002: Roberto Benigni
2003: Italian National Singers' Football Team
2004: Cat Stevens
2005: Bob Geldof and The PeaceJam Foundation
2006: Peter Gabriel
2007: Don Cheadle and George Clooney
2008: Bono
2009: Annie Lennox
2010: Roberto Baggio
2012: Sean Penn
2013: Sharon Stone
2014: Bernardo Bertolucci
2015: Rene Perez

Peace Summit Award for Social Activism
In addition, the conference also awarded the "Peace Summit Award for Social Activism" to "associations which have distinguished themselves for their outstanding contribution to international peace and social justice".

2005:  PeaceJam
2010:  Nihon Hidankyo

Summit members

1999
Mikhail Gorbachev (1990)
Joseph Rotblat (1995)
Betty Williams (1976)
Rigoberta Menchú (1992)
Shimon Peres (1994)
Frederik Willem de Klerk (1993)
David Trimble (1998)

2000
Mikhail Gorbachev (1990)
Joseph Rotblat (1995)
Betty Williams (1976)
Lech Wałęsa (1983)
Adolfo Pérez Esquivel (1980)

2002
Mikhail Gorbachev (1990)
Joseph Rotblat (1995)
Adolfo Pérez Esquivel (1980)
Betty Williams (1976)
Lech Wałęsa (1983)
Rigoberta Menchú (1992)

2003
Mikhail Gorbachev (1990)
Joseph Rotblat (represented by Robert Hinde) (1995)
Betty Williams and Mairead Maguire (1976)
Lech Wałęsa (1983)
14th Dalai Lama (1989)
Shimon Peres (1994)
Óscar Arias (1987)
Médecins Sans Frontières (1999)

2004
Mikhail Gorbachev(1990)
14th Dalai Lama(1989)
Kim Dae-jung (2000)
Shimon Peres (1994)
Lech Wałęsa (1983)
José Ramos-Horta (1996)
Betty Williams (1976)
Mairead Maguire (1976)
 Rigoberta Menchù Tum (1992)
Carlos Filipe Ximenes Belo (1996)
Adolfo Pérez Esquivel (1980)
Joseph Rotblat (1995)
American Friends Service Committee (1947)
International Campaign to Ban Landmines (1997)
United Nations Children's Fund (UNICEF) (1965)
United Nations High Commissioner for Refugees (1955, 1981)
Pugwash Conferences on Science and World Affairs (1995)
International Physicians for the Prevention of Nuclear War (1985)
International Labour Organization (1969)
International Peace Bureau (1910)
Institut de Droit International (1904)
Médecins Sans Frontières (1999)
United Nations (1988, 2001)
Amnesty International (1977)

2005
Mairead Maguire (1976)
Frederik Willem de Klerk (1993)
Mikhail Gorbachev (1990)
Rigoberta Menchú (1992)
Adolfo Pérez Esquivel (1980)]
Lech Wałęsa (1983)
Betty Williams (1976)
Nelson Mandela, represented by John Samuels (1993)
American Friends Service Committee (1947)
Amnesty International (1977)
International Campaign to Ban Landmines (1997)
International Labour Organization (1969)
Institut de Droit International (1904)
International Peace Bureau (1910)
International Physicians for the Prevention of Nuclear War (1985)
Médecins Sans Frontières (1999)
Pugwash Conferences on Science and World Affairs (1995)
United Nations Children's Fund (UNICEF) (1965)
United Nations High Commissioner for Refugees (1955, 1981)
United Nations (1988, 2001)

Bibliography
Alberto Abruzzese – Morando Morandini, Dietro lo spot Franco Scepi gira Campari, Mazzotta Editore, Milano 1986
Gillo Dorfles – Massimo Di Forti Franco Scepi, Images from Italy, Mazzotta Editore, Milano 1987
Marc Le Cannu – Gillo Dorfles, Over ad Art da Depero a Scepi, Editore Electa Milano 1989
Franco Scepi produzione d’immagini, Edizione CDS Milano 1990
Trent'anni e un Secolo di Casa Campari, Guido Vergani, 1990
Franco Scepi, Over Ad' Art, Editore Alex Gallery Washington, 1993
Franco Scepi, Strategia dell’immaginazione Edizioni l’Artistica Savigliano 1992
AA. VV., Mikhail Gorbachev: Arte per la pace - oltre ogni muro, l’Uomo della Pace di Scepi Bora edizioni, Bologna 2000,  
Man for Peace, Tipleco Editore, 2003
Man for Peace, Sambero Editore, 2004 e 2005
Percorso nel Tempo, l'antica Casa di Franco Scepi, Sambero Editore, 2006

References

External links

Peace awards
Awards established in 1999
1999 establishments in Italy